The 1936 South Sydney Rabbitohs season was the 29th in the club's history. The club competed in the New South Wales Rugby Football League Premiership (NSWRFL), finishing the season 7th.

Ladder

Fixtures

Player statistics

References 

South Sydney Rabbitohs seasons
South Sydney season